Li Yiji (268–204 BC) was a Chinese philosopher and politician. He served as a political adviser to Liu Bang, the founding emperor of the Han dynasty. His brother Li Shang, served as a military general under the Han dynasty.

Life
Li Yiji was from Gaoyang, Chenliu (near present-day Kaifeng, Henan). He joined Liu Bang in around 207 BC when Liu rebelled against the Qin dynasty. Liu Bang's rebel army was preparing to attack the city of Chenliu, when Li Yiji came to Liu's camp and requested to see Liu, identifying himself as a Confucian scholar. Liu Bang disliked scholars and did not want to meet Li Yiji. Li Yiji was furious and he shouted at the sentry, "You go in and tell the Duke of Pei (Liu Bang) that I'm a drinker from Gaoyang, not a scholar!" Liu Bang was pleased when he heard that a drinker wanted to meet him and he immediately prepared a feast to welcome Li Yiji.

Li Yiji chided Liu Bang for his rude behaviour upon meeting the latter. Liu Bang was embarrassed and he apologised, and then asked Li Yiji for ideas on how to conquer Chenliu. Li Yiji returned to Chenliu and attempted to persuade the magistrate to surrender to Liu Bang, but the magistrate refused. Li Yiji then led his men to kill the magistrate and sent a messenger to Liu Bang. Liu Bang led his army to attack Chenliu and the Qin soldiers gave up when they saw that the magistrate had been killed. Liu Bang gained more than 10,000 new troops and many supplies after conquering Chenliu.

In 204 BC, during the Chu–Han Contention, when Liu Bang was besieged by Xiang Yu's forces in Xingyang, Li Yiji suggested to Liu Bang to recreate the former states of the Warring States period and install the descendants of their royal families on their respective thrones. This plan was intended to help Liu Bang gain the support of the vassal states' rulers, who would help him in the war against Xiang Yu. Liu Bang initially applauded Li Yiji's idea, but he dismissed Li's plan later after listening to Zhang Liang's opinion that the states were more likely to support Western Chu instead as Chu was superior to Han in terms of military might.

Later that year, Li Yiji volunteered to persuade the rival Qi kingdom to surrender to Liu Bang. He travelled to Qi and managed to convince Tian Guang (King of Qi) to submit to Liu Bang. However, Liu Bang's general Han Xin, who was initially ordered to attack Qi, was unaware of the change in plan. Following the advice of Kuai Tong, Han Xin made a surprise attack on Qi and conquered Lixia and Linzi (the Qi capital). Tian Guang felt that Li Yiji had betrayed him and he had Li boiled alive.

After Liu Bang became emperor and established the Han dynasty in 202 BC, he enfeoffed Li Yiji's son, Li Jie, as the Marquis of Gaoliang.

Drinker from Gaoyang
The Chinese term gaoyang jiutu, which originated from the remark made by Li Yiji when Liu Bang refused to see him, is used to describe someone who indulges heavily in alcohol and behaves in a wanton and unrestrained manner.

References

 Sima Qian. Records of the Grand Historian, Volume 97.

Chu–Han contention people

268 BC births
204 BC deaths
3rd-century BC executions
Chinese Confucianists
Chinese political philosophers
Executed Han dynasty people
Executed people from Henan
Han dynasty philosophers
Han dynasty politicians from Henan
People executed by boiling
People executed by China
Philosophers from Henan
Politicians from Kaifeng